The Encyclopaedia of Chess Openings (ECO) is a reference work describing the state of opening theory in chess, originally published in five volumes from 1974 to 1979 by the Serbian company Šahovski Informator (Chess Informant). It is currently undergoing its fifth edition. ECO may also refer to the opening classification system used by the encyclopedia.

Overview
Both ECO and Chess Informant are published by the Belgrade-based company Šahovski Informator. The moves are taken from thousands of master games and from published analysis in Informant and compiled by the editors, most of whom are grandmasters, who select the lines which they consider most relevant or critical. The chief editor since the first edition has been Aleksandar Matanović. The openings are provided in an ECO table that concisely presents the opening lines considered most critical by the editors. ECO covers the openings in more detail than rival single volume publications such as Modern Chess Openings and Nunn's Chess Openings, but in less detail than specialized opening books.

The books are intended for an international audience and contain only a small amount of text, which is in several languages. The bulk of the content consists of diagrams of positions and chess moves, annotated with symbols, many of them developed by Chess Informant. Chess Informant pioneered the use of Figurine Algebraic Notation to avoid the use of initials for the names of the pieces, which vary between languages.

Instead of the traditional names for the openings, ECO has developed a coding system that has also been adopted by other chess publications. There are five main categories, "A" to "E", corresponding to the five volumes of the earlier editions, each of which is further subdivided into 100 subcategories, for a total of 500 codes. The term "ECO" is often used as a shorthand for this coding system. ECO code is a registered trademark of Chess Informant.

Openings covered

Volume A: Flank openings
 English Opening
 Benoni Defence
 Dutch Defence
 Réti Opening
 Benko Gambit
 Old Indian Defence
 Bird's Opening
 Anti-Indian systems (Trompowsky Attack, Torre Attack, Richter–Veresov Attack)
 Irregular openings, etc.

Volume B: Semi-Open Games other than the French Defence
Sicilian Defence
Caro-Kann Defence
Pirc Defence
Alekhine's Defence
Modern Defence
Scandinavian Defence, etc.

Volume C: Open Games and the French Defence
Ruy Lopez
French Defence
Petrov's Defence
Vienna Game
Centre Game
King's Gambit
Philidor Defence
Italian (Giuoco Piano, Evans Gambit, Hungarian Defence, and Two Knights)
Scotch Game
Four Knights Game, etc.
King's Pawn Opening, etc. (covers unusual/rare 1. e4 openings such as the Elephant Gambit and Ponziani Opening).

Volume D: Closed Games and Semi-Closed Games
(including Grünfeld Defence but not other Indian Defenses)
Queen's Gambit 
Accepted
Declined (Slav, Orthodox, Tarrasch, Tartakower, Albin Countergambit, etc.)
Grünfeld Defence
Queen's Pawn Game, etc.

Volume E: Indian Defences
(other than Grünfeld Defence and Old Indian Defence)
 Nimzo-Indian Defence
 Queen's Indian Defence
 King's Indian Defence
 Catalan Opening
 Bogo-Indian Defence, etc.

Main ECO codes

A
 White first moves other than 1.e4, 1.d4 (A00–A39)
 1.d4 without 1...d5, 1...Nf6 or 1...f5: Atypical replies to 1.d4 (A40–A44)
 1.d4 Nf6 without 2.c4: Atypical replies to 1...Nf6 (A45–A49)
 1.d4 Nf6 2.c4 without 2...e6, 2...g6: Atypical Indian systems (A50–A79)
 1.d4 f5: Dutch Defence (A80–A99)

B
 1.e4 without 1...c6, 1...c5, 1...e6, 1...e5 (B00–B09)
 1.e4 c6: Caro–Kann Defence (B10–B19)
 1.e4 c5: Sicilian Defence (B20–B99)

C
 1.e4 e6: French Defence (C00–C19)
 1.e4 e5: Double King Pawn games (C20–C99)

D
 1.d4 d5: Double Queen Pawn games (D00–D69)
 1.d4 Nf6 2.c4 g6 with 3...d5: Grünfeld Defence (D70–D99)

E
 1.d4 Nf6 2.c4 e6: Indian systems with ...e6 (E00–E59)
 1.d4 Nf6 2.c4 g6 without 3...d5: Indian systems with ...g6 (except Grünfeld) (E60–E99)

First edition
The first edition was published in the following years:
 Volume A: 1979
 Volume B: 1975
 Volume C: 1974 
 Volume D: 1976
 Volume E: 1978

Second edition
The second edition was published in the following years:
 Volume A: 1996
 Volume B: 1984
 Volume C: 1981
 Volume D: 1987
 Volume E: 1991

Third edition
The third edition was published in the following years:
 Volume A: 1999 
 Volume B: 1997  
 Volume C: 1997  
 Volume D: 1998  
 Volume E: 1998

Fourth edition
The fourth edition was published in the following years:
 Volume A: 2001 
 Volume B: 2002   
 Volume C: 2000
 Volume D: 2004  
 Volume E: 2008

Fifth edition
The fifth edition was published in the following years:
 Volume C: 2006
 Volume B part 1 [ECO codes: B00–B49]: 2020
 Volume B part 2 [ECO codes: B50-B99]: 2021

See also
 Chess annotation symbols – ECO uses symbols instead of text
 Chess Informant
 List of chess books
 List of chess openings – for all ECO codes
 Opening book

References

External links
 Publisher's site
 ECO codes with names 

Encyclopedia of Chess Openings
Chess books
Chess in Serbia
20th-century encyclopedias